Patrizia Mottola (born 3 December 1970 in Vicenza) is an Italian voice actress. She contributes to voicing characters in anime, cartoons, and films.

She provides the voice of the protagonist Raf in the animated series Angel's Friends. Mottola also voiced the character Hanon Hōshō in the Italian-language version of the anime series Mermaid Melody Pichi Pichi Pitch.

She works at Merak Film, Studio Asci, Studio P.V., and other dubbing studios in Italy.

Voice work

Anime and animation
 Gordon in Fire Emblem Anime 
 Raf in Angel's Friends
 Hanon Hōshō in Mermaid Melody Pichi Pichi Pitch
 Konohamaru Sarutobi in Naruto
 Konohamaru Sarutobi in Naruto: Shippuden
 Mac in Foster's Home for Imaginary Friends
 Maria Kurenai in Vampire Knight
 Shizuka Hio in Vampire Knight Guilty
 Howdy in Hamtaro
 Urmel in Impy's Island
 Tera in Future Boy Conan (Second dub)
 Makoto Konno in The Girl Who Leapt Through Time
 Tarb in Tokyo Mew Mew
 Ritchie in Pokémon
 Jessica Herleins in Gormiti
 Kapuchiinousa in Sugarbunnies
 Kapuchiinousa in Sugarbunnies: Chocolat!
 Kapuchiinousa in Sugarbunnies: Fleur
 Yuria in Legend of Raoh: Chapter of Death in Love
 Vinnie Nasta in The Kids from Room 402
 Peasuke in Dr. Slump
 Baby Bear in Blue's Clues
 Tom in A Kind of Magic
 Kassie Carlen in Tonde Buurin
 Shorty in The Land Before Time X: The Great Longneck Migration
 Littlefoot in The Land Before Time (TV series)
 Madame Frankie Jones in Sarah Lee Jones (since 2010)
 Franklin in Franklin and in Franklin and Friends 
 Hoshimi in Maps
 Antonio in Romeo x Juliet
 Nonny in Bubble Guppies
 Megumi in Cyborg Kuro-chan
 Aleu in Balto II: Wolf Quest
 Kai Ichinose in Piano no Mori (film)
 Foxy in The Little Fox
 Ian in Olivia
 Brobot in The Adventures of Jimmy Neutron: Boy Genius
 Nina Harper in Braceface
 Tomoyo Daidouji in Cardcaptor Sakura
 Ed in Ozie Boo!
 Junior in Problem Child
 Pig in Kipper the Dog
 Maurice in The Wacky World of Tex Avery
 Daffodil in Hairy Scary
 Japolo in Shamanic Princess
 Seo Dong in Spheres
 Billy White in Poochini's Yard
 Elliot Kaufmaan in Creepschool
 Cathy Catherine and Vetrix in Yu-Gi-Oh! Zexal
 Mrs. Wicket in Mr. Bean (animated TV series)(Dud Season 5)
 Keita Amano/Nate Adams in Yo-kai Watch

Live action
 Freddie Benson in iCarly (Seasons 1-3)
 Ned Bigby in Ned's Declassified School Survival Guide
 Aubrey Fleming/Dakota Moss in "I Know Who Killed Me"
 Cookie in Spun
 Young Mother in Incendiary
 Angela in Witches of the Caribbean
 Whitney Port in The Hills
 Justin Stewart in Power Rangers Turbo
 Justin Stewart in Turbo: A Power Rangers Movie
 Ash in Avalon (2001 film)
 Carol in I Hate My 30's
 John Millon in Survivors
 Ninon Chaumette in Plus belle la vie
 Momoko Ryugasaki in Kamikaze Girls
 Jade West in "Victorious"

See also
 List of non-English language iCarly voice actors

References

External links
 
 

1970 births
Living people
Italian voice actresses
People from Vicenza